Giuseppe Antonio Felice Orelli, also referred to as Giovanni Antonio, (February 14, 1700 or 1706- died after 1776 ) was a Swiss-Italian painter, mainly of sacred subjects, active in a late baroque style.

Biography
He was born in Locarno in the Ticino, but active also in Milan and Bergamo. He studied in Milan under Giovanni Battista Sassi, a pupil of Francesco Solimena. He painted for the church of San Bartolomeo in Bergamo. He is the son of the painter Baldassare Orelli. He is the father of Vicenzo Angelo, who was also a painter in Bergamo.

References

1700 births
Year of death unknown
Swiss painters
18th-century Italian painters
Italian male painters
People from Locarno
Painters from Bergamo
Italian Baroque painters
18th-century Italian male artists